The casqued oropendola (Cacicus oseryi) is a species of bird in the family Icteridae.

It is found in Bolivia, Brazil, Ecuador, and Peru. Its natural habitat is subtropical or tropical moist lowland forests.

References

casqued oropendola
casqued oropendola
Birds of the Ecuadorian Amazon
Birds of the Peruvian Amazon
casqued oropendola
casqued oropendola
Taxonomy articles created by Polbot